Break the Silence: The Movie is a 2020 South Korean concert documentary film directed by Park Jun-soo and produced by Big Hit Three Sixty, featuring the behind-the-scenes of boy band BTS' 2018–2019 Love Yourself World Tour. Promoted as the sequel to the band's 2019 film Bring the Soul: The Movie, it was released on September 10, 2020 in select countries, with distribution handled by Trafalgar Releasing. The film is an adaptation of the band's third documentary series, Break the Silence: Docu-Series, released on the fan platform Weverse in May.

Synopsis
Break the Silence: The Movie follows the band on and off stage for 14 months during their Love Yourself World Tour and it further showcases their vulnerable emotional side, illustrating how they separate themselves from their stage personas. It also features stock footage of the band.

Background and release
The film was first announced on August 7, 2020. It was also announced that BTS' third film Bring the Soul: The Movie (2019) would be re-released in theaters on August 28–30 and that a preview of Break the Silence would be screened.

Tickets went on sale on August 13, 2020, the day the film's trailer was released. The film was released on September 10 in 70 countries, with a staggered rollout in over 40 other territories beginning September 24. In select countries, the music video for "Dynamite" was played before the film began.

Reception
The film earned $8,954,345 at the global box office.

References

External links
 
 

2020 films
2020 documentary films
Films about BTS
Documentary films about boy bands
Films set in 2018
Films set in 2019
2020s Korean-language films
South Korean documentary films
Documentary films about K-pop
Films postponed due to the COVID-19 pandemic